Washington Township is a township in Northumberland County, Pennsylvania, United States. The population at the 2010 Census was 746, an increase over the figure of 660 tabulated in 2000.

Himmel's Church Covered Bridge is located within the township.

History
The Himmel's Church Covered Bridge was listed on the National Register of Historic Places in 1979.

Geography

According to the United States Census Bureau, the township has a total area of 18.1 square miles (46.9 km2), all  land.

Demographics

As of the census of 2000, there were 660 people, 263 households, and 199 families residing in the township.  The population density was 36.4 people per square mile (14.1/km2).  There were 283 housing units at an average density of 15.6/sq mi (6.0/km2).  The racial makeup of the township was 99.70% White, 0.15% from other races, and 0.15% from two or more races. Hispanic or Latino of any race were 0.15% of the population.

There were 263 households, out of which 30.4% had children under the age of 18 living with them, 65.4% were married couples living together, 6.8% had a female householder with no husband present, and 24.3% were non-families. 21.3% of all households were made up of individuals, and 14.8% had someone living alone who was 65 years of age or older.  The average household size was 2.51 and the average family size was 2.94.

In the township the population was spread out, with 23.3% under the age of 18, 6.1% from 18 to 24, 26.7% from 25 to 44, 27.6% from 45 to 64, and 16.4% who were 65 years of age or older.  The median age was 42 years. For every 100 females, there were 103.7 males.  For every 100 females age 18 and over, there were 96.9 males.

The median income for a household in the township was $39,000, and the median income for a family was $49,625. Males had a median income of $33,036 versus $21,023 for females. The per capita income for the township was $17,675.  About 5.6% of families and 7.9% of the population were below the poverty line, including 13.8% of those under age 18 and 11.1% of those age 65 or over.

References

Populated places established in 1774
Townships in Northumberland County, Pennsylvania
Townships in Pennsylvania